In film production, a development executive (often called DE for short) is a high-level position generally above a Creative Executive on the Studio Executive totem pole. Their duties include reading scripts and finding source material which can be turned into motion picture content (feature films, television series, television films).

References
 Getinmedia.com What A Development Executive Does
 Screenwritersutopia.com, Interview with Development Executive Janna Gelfand

Entertainment occupations
 
Filmmaking occupations
Film production